Sual, officially the Municipality of Sual, is a 1st class municipality in the province of Pangasinan, Philippines. According to the 2020 census, it has a population of 39,091 people.

The Philippines largest coal power plant, the 1200 megawatt Sual Power Station, is located in this municipality. It used to be owned by Mirant Services LLC.

Sual is one of the towns where the Spanish galleon brought their goods to trade.

History 
Sual used to be a part of a town called San Isidro Labrador de Tobuang (now called Labrador). However Sual would separate from this town when an issue was decreed by the Spanish Governor General Rafael Maria de Aguilar.
In May 2019, Liseldo D.Q. Calugay, after a landslide victory, end the 15-year reign of the Arcinue clan. Naval Base Lingayen built a PT boat base at Sual in 1945.

Maritime issues
On January, 2008, Bolinao Mayor Alfonso Celeste said the local government will file damage suit against Indonesian owners of the barge APOL 3003. The University of the Philippines Marine Science Institute (UPMSI) stated that the environmental damage was PHP54.9 million. The barge towed by a tug boat from Indonesia to the power plant in Sual on November 27 when Typhoon Mina destroyed its anchor and rope, then hurled it to Ilog Malino reef, spilling 95% of its coal cargo.

Geography

Barangays
Sual is politically subdivided into 19 barangays. These barangays are headed by elected officials: Barangay Captain, Barangay Council, whose members are called Barangay Councilors. All are elected every three years.

Climate

Demographics

Economy

Government
Sual, belonging to the first congressional district of the province of Pangasinan, is governed by a mayor designated as its local chief executive and by a municipal council as its legislative body in accordance with the Local Government Code. The mayor, vice mayor, and the councilors are elected directly by the people through an election which is being held every three years.

Elected officials

Tourism
 St. Peter the Martyr Parish Church
Limahong Beach Resort in Cabalitian island

Gallery

References

External links

 Sual Profile at PhilAtlas.com
 Municipal Profile at the National Competitiveness Council of the Philippines
 Sual at the Pangasinan Government Website
 Local Governance Performance Management System
 [ Philippine Standard Geographic Code]
 Philippine Census Information

Municipalities of Pangasinan